Moultrie is the county seat and largest city of Colquitt County, Georgia, United States. It is the third largest city in Southwest Georgia, behind Thomasville and Albany. As of the 2020 census, Moultrie's population was 14,638. It was originally known as Ochlockoney until it was incorporated by the Georgia General Assembly in 1859.
Moultrie is an agricultural community set in the Southern Rivers part of Georgia. 

Downtown Moultrie contains the Moultrie Commercial Historic District, listed on the National Register of Historic Places. The district includes the Colquitt Theatre.

It is well known for its boutiques and restaurants. Moultrie is the home of former US Senator Saxby Chambliss.

Geography
The city is located between Albany to the northwest, Tifton to the northeast, Thomasville to the southwest, and Valdosta to the southeast.

Moultrie is located at  (31.170188, -83.783601).

History

The city was named after Gen. William Moultrie, the Revolutionary War hero after whom Fort Moultrie was named following the successful defense of Charleston, South Carolina, against the British under Peter Parker, an anniversary subsequently celebrated as Carolina Day.

Colquitt County became the 115th county in Georgia by an act of the Legislature on February 25, 1856. It was named after Walter Terry Colquitt, a minister, statesman and lawyer who was a military leader in the mid-1860s. In 1879, a charter was adopted and 50 acres (0.03 km2) in the center of the county was declared the county seat.

Founders of naval stores started harvesting timber in the late 1890s. They set up turpentine stills and built tram roads, allowing for the railroad to come into the territory. The Boston & Albany line, which later became the Georgia Northern Railway, was the first through town, bringing with it growth and prosperity for the county. Practically every train brought new residents interested in supplying naval stores or working in the sawmills.

By 1900, through the work of businessmen, bankers and speculators, the county was becoming a farmer's paradise.

Land was cleared and development companies began dividing the forested area into farm tracts. Experienced farmers from north Georgia and the Carolinas were invited to come and develop the land. The county's agriculture industry thrives today.

Moultrie Commercial Historic District
Moultrie Commercial Historic District is a historic area of Moultrie with several buildings of historical significance including the Moultrie Colquitt Towers, formerly a hotel called Hotel Colquitt. The district was listed on the National Register of Historic Places on June 3, 1994. The area is generally bounded by northeast First Avenue, southeast Second Avenue, West First Street and East Fourth Street.

The district's coordinates are 31°10′48″N 83°47′14″W / 31.18°N 83.787222°W / 31.18; -83.787222.

Demographics

2020 census

As of the 2020 United States Census, there were 14,638 people, 4,945 households, and 2,988 families residing in the city.

2012
As of the census of 2012, there were 14,506 people, 5,663 households, and 3,505 families residing in the city. The racial makeup of the city was 38.05% White, 50.2% African American, 0.33% Native American, 0.37% Asian, 0.05% Pacific Islander, 2.99% from other races, and 0.98% from two or more races. Hispanic or Latino people of any race were 10.02% of the population.

There were 5,663 households, out of which 31.4% had children under the age of 18 living with them, 34.0% were married couples living together, 23.5% had a female householder with no husband present, and 38.1% were non-families. 33.9% of all households were made up of individuals, and 15.8% had someone living alone who was 65 years of age or older.  The average household size was 2.43 and the average family size was 3.13.

In the city, the population was spread out, with 28.4% under the age of 18, 10.2% from 18 to 24, 25.8% from 25 to 44, 19.7% from 45 to 64, and 16.0% who were 65 years of age or older.  The median age was 34 years. For every 100 females, there were 87.2 males.  For every 100 females age 18 and over, there were 81.7 males.

The median income for a household in the city was $36,193, and the median income for a family was $43,406. Males had a median income of $27,856 versus $26,417 for females. The per capita income for the city was $40,657.  About 16.0% of families and 19.6% of the population were below the poverty line, including 17.8% of those under age 18 and 16.1% of those age 65 or over.

Education

Colquitt County School District 
Moultrie public schools are controlled by the Colquitt County Board of Education.  The Colquitt County School District holds grades pre-school to grade twelve, consisting of ten elementary schools, a middle school, a junior high school, and one high school. As of November 27, 2020, the district had more than 9,100 students and 1,351 staff, which includes both certified and classified staff.

Elementary schools 
Cox Elementary School
Doerun Elementary School
Funston Elementary School
G.E.A.R. Gifted Center    
Hamilton Elementary School
Norman Park Elementary School
Odom Elementary School
Okapilco Elementary School
Stringfellow Elementary School
Sunset Elementary School
Wright Elementary School
Pre-K Program

Middle schools
Williams Middle School

Junior high school
C. A. Gray Junior High School

High school
Colquitt County High School

Private schools 
Colquitt County also has a small, private Christian School, Colquitt Christian Academy, which is located at Calvary Baptist Church.

Higher education 
Southern Regional Technical College – Main Campus
Abraham Baldwin Agricultural College – Moultrie Campus
Philadelphia College of Osteopathic Medicine – South Georgia Campus. PCOM South Georgia opened in August 2019, offering a Doctor of Osteopathic Medicine (DO) degree, and added a Master of Science in Biomedical Sciences in the fall of 2020.

Industry
Industry in the Moultrie area grew considerably when Sanderson Farms opened a processing plant in 2006 that now employs over 1,000 workers, over 10 percent of the local workforce. The manufacturer of light, single-engined STOL aircraft, the Maule Air, is also located in Moultrie.

Telecommunications
There are three radio channels and three television stations located in Moultrie.

Radio
WMTM-1300 AM  News/Talk
WMTM-93.9 FM  Oldies Cruisin' 94
WWGW-LP 102.5 FM

Television
WSWG CBS TV'
CW44 CW TV
WSWG2 My Network TV

Transportation
Moultrie is served by US 319, which connects to Interstate 75 and Interstate 10. State Road 37 and State Road 111 also run through Moultrie. Moultrie has two public airports used primarily for general aviation, Moultrie Municipal Airport and Spence Airport.

Historic sites
Moultrie is home to several sites on the National Register of Historic Places listings in Colquitt County, Georgia of the National Register of Historic Places.

Points of interest
 Museum of Colquitt County History
 Reed Bingham State Park – offers camping, hiking, fishing, birding, and boating on a 375 acre lake. Wildlife includes bald eagles, alligators, and gopher tortoises.
 Ellen Payne Odom Genealogy Library
 Spence Field
 Colquitt County Arts Center – home to permanent collections, theatre groups, concerts, art education, and the Fall Quilt Exhibition
 Tom White Linear Park – a 7.5 mile "Rails to Trails" project, for walkers and cycle enthusiasts

Climate
The climate in this area is characterized by relatively high temperatures and evenly distributed precipitation throughout the year. According to the Köppen Climate Classification system, Moultrie has a humid subtropical climate, abbreviated "Cfa" on climate maps.

Notable people

References

External links

Moultrie-Colquitt County Chamber of Commerce
Olde Greenfield Church and Historic Cemetery historical marker

Cities in Georgia (U.S. state)
Cities in Colquitt County, Georgia
Micropolitan areas of Georgia (U.S. state)
County seats in Georgia (U.S. state)
1879 establishments in Georgia (U.S. state)
Populated places established in 1879